In arithmetic and algebra, the fifth power or sursolid of a number n is the result of multiplying five instances of n together:
.

Fifth powers are also formed by multiplying a number by its fourth power, or the square of a number by its cube.

The sequence of fifth powers of integers is:
 
0, 1, 32, 243, 1024, 3125, 7776, 16807, 32768, 59049, 100000, 161051, 248832, 371293, 537824, 759375, 1048576, 1419857, 1889568, 2476099, 3200000, 4084101, 5153632, 6436343, 7962624, 9765625, ...

Properties

For any integer n, the last decimal digit of n5 is the same as the last (decimal) digit of n, i.e. 

By the Abel–Ruffini theorem, there is no general algebraic formula (formula expressed in terms of radical expressions) for the solution of polynomial equations containing a fifth power of the unknown as their highest power. This is the lowest power for which this is true. See quintic equation, sextic equation, and septic equation.

Along with the fourth power, the fifth power is one of two powers k that can be expressed as the sum of k − 1 other k-th powers, providing counterexamples to Euler's sum of powers conjecture. Specifically, 

  (Lander & Parkin, 1966)

See also
Eighth power
Seventh power
Sixth power
Fourth power
Cube (algebra)
Square (algebra)
Perfect power

Footnotes

References
 
 
 
 
 
 

Integers
Number theory
Elementary arithmetic
Integer sequences
Unary operations
Figurate numbers